Michael Lammer (born 25 March 1982) is a retired Swiss professional tennis player. At the 2009 Allianz Suisse Open in Gstaad, he won the doubles tournament with compatriot Marco Chiudinelli. It was his only ATP tour title.

Early life and junior career
Lammer was born on 25 March 1982 to parents Ernst and Susi, and started playing tennis at the age of six.

As a junior, he was ranked as high as No. 7 in the world singles rankings in May 2000 (and No. 12 in doubles).

Professional career

In 2009 in Gstaad, Lammer won his first ATP tour title with fellow Swiss player Marco Chiudinelli. Having been granted a wildcard into the doubles draw, they managed to reach the final. There, they defeated the No. 1 seeds Jaroslav Levinský and Filip Polášek 7–5, 6–3. It was Lammer's first ATP final, and his first title.

Lammer represented Switzerland in the 2014 Davis Cup World Group 1R, partnering with Marco Chiudinelli to win 3–2 over Serbia. His doubles victory with Chiudinelli clinched the first round victory over Serbia, allowing Switzerland to advance to the quarterfinals for the first time since 2004. Switzerland went on to win its first Davis Cup in history.

Retirement
Lammer retired in March 2015, after playing a doubles match with Roger Federer in Indian Wells. Subsequently, he became a coach of the Swiss Under 14s tennis team.

Playing style

Lammer is right-handed and plays with a single-handed backhand. He prefers to run around his backhand in favour of a forehand, especially on clay when given more time.

Lammer cites Stefan Edberg, Pete Sampras and Roger Federer as his tennis idols.

ATP career finals

Doubles: 1 (1–0)

National Participation

Davis Cup (4 wins, 9 losses)

   indicates the result of the Davis Cup match followed by the score, date, place of event, the zonal classification and its phase, and the court surface.

Wins: 1

References

External links
 
 
 

1982 births
Living people
Swiss male tennis players
People from Dübendorf
Sportspeople from the canton of Zürich
21st-century Swiss people